In mathematics, Cartan's theorems A and B are two results proved by Henri Cartan around 1951, concerning a coherent sheaf  on a Stein manifold . They are significant both as applied to several complex variables, and in the general development of sheaf cohomology.

Theorem B is stated  in cohomological terms (a formulation that Cartan (1953, p. 51) attributes to J.-P. Serre):

Analogous properties were established by Serre (1957) for coherent sheaves in algebraic geometry, when  is an affine scheme. The analogue of Theorem B in this context is as follows :

These theorems have many important applications. At a deeper level, these theorems were used by Jean-Pierre Serre to prove the GAGA theorem.

Theorem B is sharp in the sense that if  for all coherent sheaves  on a complex manifold  (resp. quasi-coherent sheaves  on a noetherian scheme ), then  is Stein (resp. affine); see   (resp.  and ).

See also 
 Cousin problems

References
.
 .
.
 

Several complex variables
Topological methods of algebraic geometry
Theorems in algebraic geometry